Pterolophia occidentalis is a species of beetle in the family Cerambycidae. It was described by Bernhard Schwarzer in 1931.

References

occidentalis
Beetles described in 1931